Pius F. Koakanu (sometimes known as John F. Koakanu or Koakanu II; died March 2, 1885) was a Hawaiian high chief (aliʻi) from the island of Kauai who served as a politician during the Kingdom of Hawaii and the Kahu or Keeper of the Royal Mausoleum of Hawaii at Mauna ʻAla.

Life and career
Koakanu was the son of Namaile and the influential High Chiefess Kuini Liliha, who served as Governor of Oahu from 1829 to 1831 and was also the hānai (adoptive) daughter of Hoapili, a confidante of King Kamehameha I. He shared name with his maternal grandfather Koakanu. Through his mother, he was descended from the ancient kings of Hawaii Island and the Moi of Maui. His full siblings were Abigail Maheha and Kailinoa while his half-siblings were Jane Loeau, Aberahama Kaikioewa Palekaluhi, and Mary Ann Kiliwehi. Two of his sisters Jane and Abigail studied at the Chiefs' Children's School, also known as the Royal School, a select school for the royal children of the highest rank who were chosen by Kamehameha III to be eligible for the throne of the Kingdom of Hawaii. Koakanu was considered a high chief of Kauai and resided at Koloa.

Koakanu served as a member of the House of Representatives for Koloa, Kauai in the Legislature of the Kingdom of Hawaii. He was first elected as an Independent candidate against Kaiu, the Government candidate, for the regular session of 1868, which ran from April 18 to June 24. Koakanu did not serve in the next two session and William Hyde Rice was elected instead as Koloa's representative for the 1870 and 1872 sessions. Koakanu was re-elected in 1874 and served the special session and regular session of 1874. In 1874, after the death of Lunalilo without an heir, a monarchical election was held to decide who would succeed to the throne; Koakanu participated in the special session of the legislature which voted thirty-nine to six in favor of Kalākaua over Queen Dowager Emma as the second elected monarch of Hawaii. The subsequent announcement to the public triggered the Honolulu Courthouse riot as Emmaite supporters hunted down and attacked native legislators who supported Kalākaua. As one of the legislators to vote for Kalākaua, Koakanu was beaten by the rioters. Historian Jon Kamakawiwoʻole Osorio noted that "the attacks were conducted by Natives against Natives over issues of loyalty and kanaka identity". The rioters tore apart the courthouse and created makeshift clubs to use as bludgeons. One legislator J. W. Lonoaea later died from his wounds. In order to quell the civil disruption, American and British troops were landed with the permission of the Hawaiian government, and the rioters were arrested. Koakanu recovered and returned on April 30 to serve out his post during the regular session which ended August 8.

In 1877, he and Kalākaua became one of the twelve charter members of the Hui Kawaihau, a business group involved in sugar cultivation near Kapaʻa in eastern Kauai. He unsuccessfully appealed to overturn the Bernice Pauahi Bishop Estate in 1885 by claiming to be an heir-in-law as Pauahi's third cousin (both sharing descent from the Maui King Kamehamehanui Aiʻluau). The appeal was denied on the ground he was too distantly related to the deceased and other closer relations had not expressed their claims. Sometime after the death of Haumea on May 3, 1878, Koakanu was appointed as Kahu or Keeper of the Royal Mausoleum of Hawaii at Mauna ʻAla, a position he held until his death.

Death 
Koakanu died on March 2, 1885, at Nuʻuanu. His obituaries in the Hawaiian newspapers Ko Hawaii Paeaina and Ka Nupepa Kuokoa noted he was not ill at the time of his death. His obituary in the English newspaper The Pacific Commercial Advertiser noted his fail attempts at overturning the Bishop Estate and stated "his death being caused, as his acquaintance report, by remorse and fear."

Koakanu and his wife Peke had one daughter named Lanihau, who succeed him as Kahu of Mauna ʻAla and later became the last female Governor of Kauai from 1886 to 1888. In an 1873 letter by Queen Emma, she mentioned Koakanu had a mistress although does not name her.

In 1915, the Kauai newspaper The Garden Island featured a piece about the history of Koloa by Kauai-born William Owen Smith. Smith included Koakanu as a prominent Hawaiian in the early history of Koloa: "Among the other prominent Hawaiians were Pius F. Koakanu who was not a very Godly man. He was a fiery speaker and a man of much force."

References

Bibliography 

 
 
 
 
 

 
 
 
 
 

Hawaiian Kingdom politicians
Hawaiian nobility
People from Kauai
House of Kekaulike
Royalty of the Hawaiian Kingdom
Members of the Hawaiian Kingdom House of Representatives
1885 deaths
Native Hawaiian politicians
Nobility of the Americas